Cipher Method is Negative Format's fourth CD. The album was built with complex beat and rhythm structures, mixing Negative Format's trance melodies with dark atmospheric overtones, and a mixture of vocoded and EBM vocal passages.

Track listing
"Cipher"
"Automate"
"Transfer"
"Schema"
"Algorythm"
"Senseless"
"Vertex"
"Static"
"Encryption"
"Downfall (atmosphere)"
"Packet Filter"

References

2000 albums